The Vidarbha movement includes political activities organised by various individuals, organizations and political parties, for creation of a separate state of Vidarbha, within the republic of India, with Nagpur as the capital. The proposed state corresponds to the eastern 11 districts of the state of Maharashtra. It makes up for 31% of area and 21% of population of the present state of Maharashtra. The area is covered by thick tropical forests and is surplus in electricity, minerals, rice and cotton.

Statehood demand 

The Vidarbha region is a centrally located area in India and forms eastern part of Maharashtra state. The demand for a separate state of Vidarbha was raised for the first time over 100 years ago. As a result of which, the Central Provinces legislature passed a unanimous resolution to create a separate state of 'Mahavidarbha' on 1 October 1938 at Nagpur. Some people celebrate 1 October as 'Vidarbha Day' This was much before the demand for a "Samyukta Maharashtra" was even conceived.
Vidarbha State formation does not occur due to West Maharashtra (Mumbai and Pune) political party Rule.

After merger with the new state of Maharashtra, the demand of separate statehood was raised time and again, with an economic view, quoting the increasing developmental backlog.

State Reorganization Commission 

The Government of India appointed the first State Reorganisation Committee (SRC) under Chairmanship of Fazal Ali on 29 December 1953.

Vidarbhite leaders at that time, like M S Aney and Brijlal Biyani, submitted a memorandum to State Reorganisation Commission (SRC) for a separate Vidarbha State.

Dr. Babasaheb Ambedkar had also favoured a "One state - One language" principle for reorganisation of states, he was against "one language - one state" policy. Accordingly, he submitted his views about forming at least 2 separate states of Marathi-speaking people, instead of a single large state of Maharashtra. He thought one state should have one language but at the same time, there can be two or more separate states of one language, depending upon the need for efficient administration. He had clearly favoured "Vidarbha State" with Nagpur as capital, saying, "Single government can not administer such a huge state as United Maharashtra."

The Fazal Ali SRC, after considering these memoranda and all other related aspects, favoured a separate Vidarbha State with Nagpur as capital in the year 1956.

But Vidarbha was made part of the new state of Maharashtra in 1960 by the central government, favouring the "One language - One state" principle.

Nagpur Pact 

The 1953 Nagpur Pact assures equitable development of all the regions of the proposed Marathi State. Most prominent clause of the Nagpur Pact was: one session of Maharashtra state assembly in Nagpur city every year, with minimum six weeks duration, to discuss issues exclusively related to Vidarbha.

The signatories to the pact in 1953 were:

 Yashwantrao Chavan, then Minister in Morarji Desai ministry of Bombay State
 Ramrao Krishnarao Patil, Gandhian, Ex ICS Officer and member of first Planning Commission of India.
Some honourable person rejected to sign 1953 pact were:
 Dhananjay Rao Gadgid, Nagpur
 D.V.Gokhale, Wardha
 Narayanrao Deshmukh Shirala Amravati
 JagannathRao Deshmukh Nerpingalai Amravati

Merger with Maharashtra 

On 1 May 1960, the Vidarbha state was merged with a newly formed Maharashtra State, under the agreement known as  Nagpur Pact. At that time Nagpur city lost the state capital status. Nagpur thus became the only city in independent India, which lost "state capital status" after historically being a capital of the biggest state of India (by area) for more than 100 years.

Post merger developments 

After the merger, winter assembly session is being held regularly at Nagpur. Contrary to the provisions of "Nagpur Pact", the session is never held for complete six weeks. Moreover, although session is supposed to discuss exclusively issues related to Vidarbha, it is conducted like any other Maharashtra state assembly session, discussing all issues. The Vidarbha region under new Maharashtra state allegedly continued to suffer in development, giving impetus to the renewed  demand of more equitable development of all regions of Maharashtra.

Under these circumstances, the Maharashtra Government appointed a committee, to study regional imbalances in Maharashtra. The committee found that:
 "The failure to report to the state assembly every year in terms of the Nagpur Agreement, has been a serious lapse on the part of the state Government. If a report had been made to state legislature, as per the Nagpur Agreement, the matter would have received sustained attention. In the circumstances this did not happen."

Political groups associated with the movement 

A staunch Vidarbhite Madhav Shrihari Aney won the Nagpur loksabha seat in 1962, on separate Vidarbha state agenda as an independent candidate.

Raje Vishveswarrao won Chandrapur loksabha seat in 1977, on separate Vidarbha agenda.

Mr Jambuwantrao Dhote won, Nagpur loksabha seat in 1971, as a Forward Bloc candidate, with a clear separate Vidarbha state agenda. Vidarbha Janata Congress was founded by Mr Jambuwantrao Dhote, on 9 September 2002 for the separate Vidarbha state.

Former central cabinet ministers of congress party, Vasant Sathe and N. K. P. Salve, formed the Vidarbha Rajya Nirman Congress in 2003, with a clear separate Vidarbha-state agenda.

Former member of parliament from Nagpur, Banawarilal Purohit floated the Vidarbha Rajya Party in 2004, just before the loksabha elections, with a clear agenda of the separate Vidarbha state.

After declaration of the separate Telangana state by central Government on 9 December 2009, all these and more than 65 other organizations have joined, demanding the separate Vidarbha state. This umbrella group is known as Vidarbha Rajya Sangram Samitee.

Most prominent amongst this group is the Bharatiya Janata Party, which is committed to the cause of the separate Vidarbha state, as per its national manifesto. Bharipa Bahujan Mahasangh (BBM) leader Prakash Ambedkar, Nationalist Congress Party (NCP), Bahujan Samaj Party (BSP), Samajwadi Party (SP), all the factions of  Republican Party of India (RPI) have pledged full support to the separate Vidarbha-state movement.

During 2014 Maharashtra Assembly elections, as per some news-reports statehood for Vidarbha became a non-issue and the Vidarbha Rajya Andolan Samiti (VJAS) had appealed to the people of Vidarbha to opt for NOTA (None of the above) option in this election, as no party was raising the issue of a separate Vidarbha State.
Some high post bureaucrats said that Western Maharashtra parties want monopoly over maharashtra by suppressing Vidarbha.

Other related happenings.

The Shiv Sena has been opposing it on the plank that Marathi-speaking people shouldn't be divided and reminds that Samyukta Maharashtra Movement fructified into United Maharashtra only after  sacrifice of 105 martyrs in agitations for same., In 2009–10, Shiv Sena formed the Akhand Maharashtra Parishad in Vidarbha, to conduct a series of lectures in different regions of Vidarbha by experts on socio-economic and political issues.

Selected streams of opinion 

The educated middle class in West Vidarbha (Amravati administrative division) says that the concept of a separate Vidarbha is in fact a ploy of Hindi speakers from North-Central India and traders from gujrati marwadi Jain community. while former want greater access to political power the latter wants to cultivate economic interests.
Vidarbha Bureaucrat says that western area is distributed by party like Nashik MNS, Pune NCP, Mumbai Shivsena. And Vidarbha is Orphan.

The middle class in Western Maharashtra, Konkan and Marathwada say that vidarbhite political leaders are responsible for the decline and underdevelopment of Vidarbha; But whenever the question of Vidarbha's economic backwardness comes up, the people of Western Maharashtra are held responsible. The issue of farmer suicides in Vidarbha is certainly important; But there are also many socio-economic-political reasons behind this and we should better not allow third party to politicize the issue like farmers suicides merely to gain political mileage.

Timeline

 Advocate general of Maharashtra government Mr Shrihari Aney resigned from his position 23 March 2016. He did so, to be able to support separate Vidarbha movement full-time and wholeheartedly.
 Vidarbha Maza, the new political party floated by Rajkumar Tirpude, son of Maharashtra's first deputy chief minister late Nashikrao Tirpude, is ready to contest elections starting from those for municipal councils in the region.

See also
List of proposed states and territories of India

References 

Politics of Maharashtra
Reorganisation of Indian states
Vidarbha
History of Maharashtra (1947–present)